Mai Britt "Embee" Normann (born 16 April 1966 Gjøvik, Norway) is a Norwegian singer-songwriter.

Career 
Normann has been a recognized songwriter in Norway and internationally for 25 years, after her acclaimed debut album Wonderland (Embee Normann, 1993). She also made lyrics for the Norwegian band Vagabond on their debut album  Vagabond in 1994, TNT on their album Firefly (1997) with Three Nights Live in Tokyo, and the Ronni Le Tekrø album Extra Strong String (1998). Her second solo album release Full of Light (MB Normann, 2000). Normann writes most of her lyrics in English, increasingly also in Norwegian, and has relatively large catalog. She performed her song "Stormy Weather" together with Ronni Le Tekrø at the norwegian TV show "Gundersen & Grønlund A/S" in 1992, which aired on NRK. In recent years, after her latest release which is called "In-Between Dusk & Dawn", she has been performing intimate concerts in and around her hometown, Gjøvik.

Discography 
1993: Wonderland (Stageway)
2000: Full of Light (Beatheaven)
2013: In-Between Dusk And Dawn (Enger Music)
2019:  Drizzle (Embee Normann og Jørun Bøgeberg)

References 

Women guitarists
Musicians from Gjøvik
Norwegian women singers
Norwegian folk singers
Norwegian guitarists
Norwegian composers
1966 births
Living people